The Wikimedian of the Year is an annual award that honors Wikipedia editors and other contributors to Wikimedia projects to highlight major achievements within the Wikimedia movement, established in August 2011 by Wikipedia's co-founder Jimmy Wales. Wales selects the recipients and honors them at Wikimania, an annual conference of the Wikimedia Foundation—except in 2020, 2021, and 2022 when the recipients were announced at online meetings as a consequence of the COVID-19 pandemic. From 2011 to 2017, the award was named Wikipedian of the Year.

In 2011, the first title was given to Rauan Kenzhekhanuly for his work on the Kazakh Wikipedia. The following year, it was awarded to an editor identified as "Demmy" for creating a bot to translate 15,000 short English articles into Yoruba, a language spoken in Nigeria. In 2013, Rémi Mathis of Wikimédia France and the French Wikipedia was named for his role in an article controversy. In 2014, the award was given posthumously to Ukrainian journalist Ihor Kostenko, who actively promoted the Ukrainian Wikipedia on social networking sites and was killed during a protest. Wales named an undisclosed recipient in 2015, and hopes someday to tell their story. In 2016, the first joint award was presented to Emily Temple-Wood and Rosie Stephenson-Goodknight for their efforts to combat harassment on Wikipedia and increase its coverage of women. Other recipients include Felix Nartey, Farhad Fatkullin, and Emna Mizouni.

In addition to the main award, Susanna Mkrtchyan and Satdeep Gill were the first to receive honorable mentions in 2015. Since then, other honorable mentions have been conferred. The award was expanded in 2021 with additional categories including Media Contributor of the Year, Newcomer of the Year, Tech Contributor of the Year, and Wikimedia Laureate.

List of recipients

Honorable mentions

Newcomer of the Year
The Newcomer of the Year award was first presented in 2021.

Wikimedia Laureate (formerly 20th Year Honouree)
The 20th Year Honouree award was first presented in 2021. In 2022, the award was renamed Wikimedia Laureate.

Tech Contributor of the Year (formerly Tech Innovator) 
The Tech Innovator award was first presented in 2021. The honor was renamed Tech Contributor of the Year in 2022.

Media Contributor of the Year (formerly Rich Media) 
The Rich Media award was first presented in 2021. The honor was renamed Media Contributor of the Year in 2022.

Wikimedia Affiliate Spotlight 
The Wikimedia Affiliate Spotlight was first presented in 2022. Art+Feminism and Wikimedia UK were recognized by the Wikimedia Affiliation Committee (AffCom) in the Partnerships and Governance categories, respectively.

See also 
 List of volunteer awards

References

External links
 

 
Awards established in 2011